The reporter of decisions of the Supreme Court of the United States is the official charged with editing and publishing the opinions of the Supreme Court of the United States, both when announced and when they are published in permanent bound volumes of the United States Reports. The reporter is responsible for only the contents of the United States Reports issued by the Government Printing Office, first in preliminary prints and later in the final bound volumes. The reporter is not responsible for the editorial content of unofficial reports of the court's decisions, such as the privately published Supreme Court Reporter and Lawyers' Edition.

By federal statute, the reporter is appointed by the Supreme Court. The office is currently held by Rebecca Anne Womeldorf.

History
The first two reporters acted in an unofficial capacity. Only in 1817 did Congress create the statutory office of reporter, with a $1,000 a year salary. The early reporters profited from selling the printed volumes of the reports of decisions. In 1874, Congress for the first time appropriated funds to publish the volumes of the court's opinions; from that time the report was known as the United States Reports and numbering began as if the first volume by the first reporter, Alexander J. Dallas, was number one. The Government Printing Office took over publication of the United States Reports in 1922. The title of court's reporter was changed to "Reporter of Decisions" in 1953, to clarify the duties of the office.

List of reporters
The 16 reporters of decisions are listed here with their tenures and the volumes of the United States Reports they edited. Through volume 90, the volumes were also known by the name of the reporter and the numbers of those "nominative reports" are listed after the United States Reports numbers.

See also 
 Court reporter
 Lists of United States Supreme Court cases by volume
 Reporter of decisions for similar offices in other countries
 United States v. Detroit Timber & Lumber Co.
 Wheaton v. Peters, a dispute between two reporters that reached the Supreme Court

References

Supreme Court of the United States people